Suresh Narayan Dhanorkar, also called Balubhau Dhanorkar, is the newly elected member of Lok Sabha from Chandrapur constituency. He belongs to the Indian National Congress political party. He is the only candidate for Indian national Congress to be elected as MP from Maharashtra.

He was nominated as the Lok Sabha candidate after resigning as MLA from Shiv Sena and joined the Indian National Congress Party.

Political career
2006: Shivsena President, Chandrapur District
2014:MLA-Shivsena from Warora-Bhadrawati
2019:MP- INC from Chandrapur Lok Sabha constituency

References

External links
Official biographical sketch in Parliament of India website

Maharashtra MLAs 2014–2019
Living people
Shiv Sena politicians
People from Chandrapur district
1975 births